Urhan or Urhin is a townland in Ireland on the Beara Peninsula. The townland is on the coast between Slieve Miskish and Coulagh Bay, situated on the coast road between Allihies and Eyeries. It has one pub, The Urhan Inn, and a national school. Urhan is on the Ring of Beara and the Wild Atlantic Way.

References

External links
 Local towns

Townlands of County Cork